Kirchhof may refer to:

Hans Wilhelm Kirchhof (1525?-1602?), sometimes known as Kirchhoff, German Landsknecht, baroque poet and translator
Paul Kirchhof (b. 1943), German jurist, tax law expert, former judge in the Federal Constitutional Court of Germany
Ferdinand Kirchhof (b. 1950), German judge, jurisprudent, tax law expert
Lutz Kirchhof (b. 1953), German lutenist
Kirchhof, Melsungen, a district of the town Melsungen in Hesse, Germany

See also
Kirchhoff, surname